James Jordan Bazley (born 8 April 1995) is an Australian cricketer. He has been described as an all-rounder who is a medium-fast bowler and power-hitting lower order batsman.

Bazley began his cricket career playing for the Sunshine Coast Cricket Club in Queensland Premier Cricket. He was selected to represent Australia at the 2014 Under 19 World Cup and was described as having an important impact in the tournament with bat and ball. He received a rookie contract with the Brisbane Heat the same year. He did not play for the Brisbane Heat in the 2014-15 season but was selected to represent a Cricket Australia XI in a T20 tour  game against South Africa. 

In 2015 Bazley was selected in the squad of the newly established Cricket Australia XI which competed in the 2015–16 Matador BBQs One-Day Cup, and he made his List A debut for the team on 5 October 2015. In November he was named as twelfth man in the Cricket Australia XI for a tour game against the visiting West Indies Test team, and he ultimately played in the match making his first-class debut and taking four wickets across two innings bowling and scoring a 50 in the only innings he batted in.

In 2015 Bazley received a rookie contract with the Queensland state team and was still playing for Sunshine Coast in grade cricket, and as of 2017 he had received a full state contract with Queensland but had moved to East Redlands in grade cricket. In 2016 he received a contract from the Hobart Hurricanes, and he suffered a career-threatening groin injury whilst training with the side in 2017 being sidelined for the entirety of the 2017/18 season and the vast majority of the 2018/19 season. 

In the 2019/20 season Bazley returned to cricket by playing for the East Redlands side in Queensland Premier Cricket and the Queensland 2nd XI, and he was contracted by the Brisbane Heat for the 2020/21 Big Bash League. In 2021 he returned to the Queensland state team receiving a full contract, and he was re-signed by the Heat for the 2022/23 Big Bash League.

References

External links
 

1995 births
Living people
Australian cricketers
Place of birth missing (living people)
Cricket Australia XI cricketers
Brisbane Heat cricketers